Fort William may refer to:

Places 
 Fort William, Ghana, a fort in Anomabu, Central Region, built in the 18th century
 Fort William Lighthouse, in Cape Coast, Central Region, Ghana, built in the 19th century, now used as a lighthouse
 Fort William, India, a fort in Kolkata
 Fort William Point (Robert Island), a conspicuous headland on the Coppermine Peninsula of Robert Island in Antarctica

Canada 
 Fort William, Ontario, a Canadian city which, together with Port Arthur, became part of Thunder Bay in 1970
 Downtown Fort William, Ontario, a neighborhood of Thunder Bay
 Fort William (electoral district), a related Canadian federal electoral district
 Fort William (provincial electoral district)
 Fort William and Rainy River, a federal electoral district from 1917 to 1925
 Fort William First Nation, an Ojibwa First Nation reserve
 Fort William Gardens, a multi-purpose arena in Thunder Bay, Ontario
 Fort William Historical Park, historical re-creation of the original Fort William (Ontario) on the Kaministiquia River
 Fort William, Newfoundland
 Fort William, a community and historic site along the Ottawa River in Sheenboro, Quebec

United Kingdom 
 Fort William, Highland, a town in Scotland
 Fort William railway station

United States 
 Fort William, Massachusetts (also called Castle William), a former name for the current Fort Independence in Boston Harbor
 Fort William (Salem, Massachusetts), 1643 fort on the site of Fort Pickering
 Fort Amsterdam (once named Fort William), New York City
 Fort William (Colorado), a frontier trading post also known as Bent's Old Fort
 Fort William (Kentucky), frontier fort 1785
 Fort William (Oregon), a fur trade outpost in Oregon Country
 Fort William (Wyoming), a frontier trading post later renamed Fort Laramie

Other uses 
 Fort William College, based in Fort William, India from 1800 to 1854
 Fort William F.C., a football club based in Fort William, Highland
 Fort William Shinty Club, a shinty team
 Supreme Court of Judicature at Fort William, Calcutta, 1774-1862

See also 
 Fort Williams (disambiguation)